Aleksandr Alekseyevich Yeshchenko (born 5 May 1970) is a former Russian professional footballer.

Club career
He made his professional debut in the Soviet Second League in 1987 for FC Torpedo Lutsk.

Honours
 Russian Premier League runner-up: 1993.
 Russian Premier League bronze: 1996.
 Russian Cup finalist: 1995.

European club competitions
With FC Rotor Volgograd.

 UEFA Cup 1994–95: 2 games.
 UEFA Cup 1995–96: 4 games.

Personal life
His father Oleksiy Yeshchenko was a football manager, coaching FC Volyn Lutsk, his son Oleg Yeshchenko is a footballer.

References

1970 births
Living people
Footballers from Lutsk
Soviet footballers
Russian footballers
Association football midfielders
Association football defenders
Russian Premier League players
FC Volyn Lutsk players
FC Karpaty Lviv players
FC SKA Rostov-on-Don players
FC Rostov players
FC Rotor Volgograd players
C.F. Os Belenenses players
FC Zhemchuzhina Sochi players
FC Elista players
FC Moscow players
FC Chernomorets Novorossiysk players
FC Baltika Kaliningrad players
Russian expatriate footballers
Russian expatriate sportspeople in Portugal
Expatriate footballers in Portugal
Expatriate footballers in Ukraine
FC Mordovia Saransk players
FC Arsenal Tula players
FC Novokuznetsk players
FC Dynamo Bryansk players